The Dress of the Year is an annual fashion award run by the Fashion Museum, Bath from 1963. Each year since 1963, the Museum has asked a fashion journalist to select a dress or outfit that best represents the most important new ideas in contemporary fashion. For 2010 the Museum broke with tradition by asking the milliner Stephen Jones, rather than a journalist, to choose an outfit; and again in 2014 when the fashion blogger, Susanna Lau of Style Bubble, was asked to choose an outfit for 2013. The outfit is then donated to the Fashion Museum along with an Adel Rootstein mannequin to represent that year's total look.

Selections in chronological order

See also

 List of fashion awards

References

Further reading

External links
 The Fashion Museum's website

Fashion awards
1960s fashion
1970s fashion
1980s fashion
1990s fashion
2000s fashion
2010s fashion
British fashion
Dresses